Álvaro Fayad Delgado "The Turk"  (in Spanish, el Turco) was a Colombian guerrilla, co-founder and leader of the 19th of April movement (M-19), founded in 1970.

Early life
Fayad was born in Ulloa Valley on July 24, 1946 and grew up in Cartago, Valle del Cauca. He obtained his high school diploma from the Seminary of Santa Rosa and entered the National University of Colombia in 1965 to study psychology. There he met fellow militant Camilo Torres Restrepo. Fayad entered the Communist Youth (Juventudes Comunistas, JUCO) and there met Jaime Bateman Cayón, an influential figure in his life. He and Bateman joined the Revolutionary Armed Forces of Colombia, where they remained until the end of 1969, when they entered the National Popular Alliance.

Career in M-19
Bateman and Fayad co-founded M-19 in response to the allegedly fraudulent defeat of General Rojas Pinilla in the presidential elections of April 19, 1970. Fayad played a very important role within its organization and other guerrilla detachments like the Popular Liberation Army.

On January 17, 1974, M-19 stole the sword of Bolívar, arguing that it symbolized both nationalism and the Bolivarian Movement. Spectacular actions as this were carried out by the M-19 in later years, but they were not successful overall. An arms heist in Cantón Norte only earned a jail term for the leaders of M-19, including Fayad. He went to trial with 219 members of M-19 in a military hearing, and served as his own lawyer; his defense appears in The Wars of the Peace by Olga Behar, along with descriptions of the torture endured by him and his companions. He was sentenced to 26 years in jail by the Military Court, but he was granted amnesty by the government of Belisario Betancur. He met with the chief executive several times to negotiate peace; in October 1983 in Madrid, Spain, they negotiated an agreement which was signed in Corinto in August 1984.

Palace of Justice siege
Fayad was killed by the police in the Quinta Paredes district of Bogota in 1986.

References

1946 births
1986 deaths
Colombian people of Lebanese descent
Members of FARC
National Popular Alliance politicians
19th of April Movement members
Colombian guerrillas killed in action